Essex Street is a station on the Hudson–Bergen Light Rail (HBLR) located between Hudson and Greene Streets in Jersey City, New Jersey. There are two tracks and two side platforms.

The station opened on April 15, 2000. Northbound service from the station is available to Hoboken Terminal and Tonnelle Avenue in North Bergen.

Station layout

Gallery

References

External links

 East entrance (Hudson Street) from Google Maps Street View
 West entrance (Greene Street) from Google Maps Street View
 Platforms from Google Maps Street View

Hudson-Bergen Light Rail stations
Transportation in Jersey City, New Jersey
Railway stations in the United States opened in 2000
2000 establishments in New Jersey